Catharina "Nina" Hagen (born 11 March 1955) is a German singer, songwriter, and actress. She is known for her theatrical vocals and rose to prominence during the punk and Neue Deutsche Welle movements in the late 1970s and early 1980s.  She is known as "The Godmother of German Punk".

Born and raised in the former East Berlin, German Democratic Republic, Hagen began her career as an actress when she appeared in several German films alongside her mother Eva-Maria Hagen. Around that same time, she joined the band Automobil and released the single "Du hast den Farbfilm vergessen". After her stepfather Wolf Biermann's East German citizenship was withdrawn in 1976, Hagen followed him to Hamburg. Shortly afterwards, she was offered a record deal from CBS Records and formed the Nina Hagen Band. Their self-titled debut album was released in late 1978 to critical acclaim and was a commercial success selling over 250,000 copies. The band released one more album, Unbehagen, before their break-up in 1979.

In 1982, Hagen signed a new contract with CBS and released her debut solo album NunSexMonkRock, which became her first record to chart in the United States. She followed it with two more albums: Fearless (1983) and Nina Hagen in Ekstasy (1985), before her contract with CBS expired and was not renewed. In 1989, she was offered a record deal from Mercury Records. She released three albums on the label: Nina Hagen (1989), Street (1991), and Revolution Ballroom (1993). However, none of the albums achieved notable commercial success. Hagen made her musical comeback with the release of her album Return of the Mother (2000).

Besides her musical career, Hagen is also a voice-over actress. She wrote three autobiographies: Ich bin ein Berliner (1988), Nina Hagen: That's Why the Lady Is a Punk (2003), and Bekenntnisse (2010). She is also noted for her human and animal rights activism.

Life and career

1955–1976: Early life and career beginnings

Nina Hagen was born in what was then East Berlin, East Germany, the daughter of Hans Oliva-Hagen, a scriptwriter, and Eva-Maria Hagen (née Buchholz), an actress and singer. Her father Hans survived the Holocaust, being held as a prisoner at a prison in Moabit between 1941 to 1945 until the liberation by the Soviet Army. Her paternal grandfather Hermann Carl Hagen, who was Jewish, was murdered at the Sachsenhausen concentration camp on 28 May 1942, at age 56. Hedwig Elise Caroline Staadt, Nina's paternal grandmother, was also murdered at Sachsenhausen. Nina's maternal grandfather Fritz Buchholz died during World War II. Her parents divorced when she was two years old. During her childhood, she saw her father infrequently. At age four, she began to study ballet, and she was considered an opera prodigy by the time she was nine.

When Hagen was 11, her mother had a relationship with Wolf Biermann, an anti-establishment singer-songwriter. Biermann's political views later influenced young Hagen. Hagen left school at age sixteen and went to Poland, where she began her career. She later returned to Germany and joined the cover band Fritzens Dampferband ("Fritzen's Steamboat Band"), together with Achim Mentzel and others. She added songs by Janis Joplin and Tina Turner to the "allowable" set lists during shows. From 1972 to 1973, Hagen enrolled in the vocal training performance program at The Central Studio for Light Music in East Berlin (de). Upon graduating, she joined the band Automobil.

In East Germany, she performed with the band Automobil, becoming one of the country's best-known young stars. Her most famous song from the early part of her career was "Du hast den Farbfilm vergessen (You Forgot the Colour Film)", with words by Kurt Demmler to music by Michael Heubach, a subtle dig mocking the sterile, gray, Communist state, in 1974. Hagen performed comic songs like "Hatschi-Waldera" and "Was denn" in Karel Gott´s Czech TV show in Slaný. and "Wir tanzen Tango" in 1976. Her musical career in the DDR was cut short, when she and her mother left the country in 1976, following the expulsion of her stepfather.

1976–1979: Migration to West Germany and Nina Hagen Band

The circumstances surrounding the family's emigration were exceptional: Biermann was granted permission by East German authorities to perform a televised concert in Cologne, but denied permission to re-cross the border to his adopted home country. Hagen submitted an application to leave the country. In it, she claimed to be Biermann's biological daughter, and threatened to become "the next" Wolf Biermann if not allowed to rejoin her father. Just four days later her request was granted, and she settled in Hamburg, where she was signed to a CBS-affiliated record label. Her label advised her to acclimatise herself to Western culture through travel, and she arrived in London during the height of the punk rock movement. Hagen was quickly taken up by a circle that included The Slits.

Back in West Germany by mid-1977, Hagen formed the Nina Hagen Band in West Berlin's Kreuzberg district. They released their self-titled debut album, Nina Hagen Band in late 1978: it included the single "TV-Glotzer" (a cover of "White Punks on Dope" by The Tubes, though with entirely different German lyrics), and "Auf'm Bahnhof Zoo", about West Berlin's then-notorious Berlin Zoologischer Garten station. The album also included a version of "Rangehn" ("Go for It"), a song she had previously recorded in East Germany, but with different music.

The debut album gained significant attention throughout Germany and abroad both for its hard rock sound and for Hagen's theatrical vocals which drew heavily from her operatic training, far different from the straightforward singing of her East German recordings. However, relations between Hagen and the other band members deteriorated over the course of the subsequent European tour, and Hagen decided to leave the band in 1979, though she was still under contract to produce a second album. This LP, Unbehagen (which in German also means "discomfort" or "unease"), was eventually produced with the band recording their tracks in Berlin and Hagen recording the vocals in Los Angeles. It included the single "African Reggae" and "Wir Leben Immer... Noch", a German language cover of Lene Lovich's "Lucky Number". The other band members, sans Hagen, soon developed a successful independent musical career as Spliff.

Meanwhile, Hagen's public persona was steadily creating media uproar. She became infamous for an appearance on an Austrian evening talk show called Club 2, on 9 August 1979, on the topic of youth culture, when she demonstrated (while clothed, but explicitly) various female masturbation positions and became embroiled in a heated argument with other panelists, in particular, writer and journalist Humbert Fink. The talk show host, Dieter Seefranz, had to step down following this controversy.

She also acted with Dutch rocker Herman Brood and singer Lene Lovich in the 1979 film Cha Cha. Brood and Hagen would have a long romantic relationship that would end when Hagen could no longer tolerate Brood's drug abuse. She would refer to Brood as her "soulmate" long after Brood committed suicide in 2001.

1980–1988: International breakthrough

A European tour with a new band in 1980 was cancelled, and Hagen turned to the United States. A limited-edition 10-inch EP was released on vinyl that summer in the U.S. Two songs from her first album Nina Hagen Band were on the A side, and two songs from her second album Unbehagen were on the B-side.  All four songs were sung in German, although two had English titles and the other two were covers of English-language songs with new German lyrics.

In late 1980, Hagen discovered she was pregnant, broke up with the father-to-be Ferdinand Karmelk, and moved to Los Angeles. Her daughter, Cosma Shiva Hagen, was born in Santa Monica on 17 June 1981. In 1982, Hagen released her first English-language album: NunSexMonkRock, a dissonant mix of punk, funk, reggae, and opera. She then went on a world tour with the No Problem Orchestra.

In 1983, she released the album Angstlos and a minor European tour. By this time, Hagen's public appearances frequently included discussions of God, UFOs, her social and political beliefs, animal rights and vivisection, and claims of alien sightings. The English version of Angstlos, Fearless, generated two major club hits in America, "Zarah" (a cover of the Zarah Leander (No. 45 USA) song "Ich weiss, es wird einmal ein Wunder geschehen") and the disco/punk/opera song, "New York New York" (No. 9 USA). During 1984, Hagen spent a lot of time in London and UK based MusicSzene magazine chief-editor Wilfried Rimensberger, in conjunction with Spree Film, produced a first TV feature on her and what was remaining from London's 70 Punk movement induced by artist and model Frankie Stein.

Her 1985 album In Ekstase fared less well, but did generate club hits with "Universal Radio" (No. 39 USA) and a cover of "Spirit in the Sky" and also featured a 1979 recording of her hardcore punk take on Paul Anka's "My Way", which had been one of her signature live tunes in previous years. She performed songs from this album during the 1985 version of Rock in Rio. While in Brazil she met and befriended Brazilian musicians as diverse as samba diva Beth Carvalho and Brazilian punk singer Supla (who was leader of a punk-new wave band named Tokyo), that invited her to contribute vocals to the hit 1986 song "Garota de Berlim" (Portuguese for "girl from Berlin") that received huge airplay in radio in Brazil. To this day, Brazilians remember Nina above all things as the Berlin Girl from Tokyo's song.

Wilfried Rimensberger and award-winning film director Lothar Spree produced a TV documentary for the German television station ZDF. This was followed by a launch of Nina's UFO fashion underwear at anti-SAFT in Zurich, where again Rimensberger joined her up with New Romantic icon Steve Strange performing on stage. Simultaneously fashion photographer Hannes Schmid produced a Nina Hagen cover for German Cosmopolitan magazine. This also coincided with leading music publications like BRAVO and MusicSzene running cover stories that all put Hagen back on the forefront of something that, in retrospect, became a final highpoint of what the punk movement was all about. At the end of 1986, her contract with CBS was over and she released the Punk Wedding EP independently in 1987, a celebration of her marriage to an 18-year-old punk South African nicknamed 'Iroquois'. It followed an independent 1986 one-off single with Lene Lovich, "Don't Kill the Animals" (see Animal Liberation).

1989–1994: Nina Hagen, Street, and Revolution Ballroom

In 1989, Hagen released the album, Nina Hagen, which was backed up by another German tour. In 1989, she had a relationship with French stylist and music manager Franck Chevalier which yielded their son, Otis Chevalier-Hagen (b. 1990).

In the 1990s, Hagen lived in Paris with her daughter Cosma Shiva and son Otis. In 1991 she toured Europe in support of her new album Street. In 1992 Hagen became the host of a TV show on RTLplus. Also in the same year (1992) she collaborated with Adamski on the European smash and minor UK hit single "Get Your Body". The following year, she released Revolution Ballroom. In 1994, Hagen starred in the acclaimed San Francisco Goethe Institut's The Seven Addictions and Five Professions of Anita Berber, playing the singer version of "Anita" alongside dancer Darla Teagarden who portrayed the other "professions" of "Anita". Also, her voice was heard on the Freaky Fukin Weirdoz single "Hit Me with Your Rhythm Stick". 1995 brought the German-language album FreuD euch, equally recorded in English as BeeHappy in 1996. Nina returned to San Francisco to star in another San Francisco Goethe Institut show, "Hannusen, Hitler's Jewish Clarvoyant". Hagen also collaborated with electronic music composer Christopher Franke, along with Rick Palombi (credited as Rick Jude) on "Alchemy of Love", the theme song for the film Tenchi Muyo! in Love.

1995–1999

In May 1996, she married David Lynn, but divorced him in the beginning of 2000. In 1997 she collaborated with German hip hop musician Thomas D. In 1998, Hagen became the host of a weekly science fiction show on the British Sci-Fi Channel, in addition to embarking on another tour of Germany. In 1999, she released the devotional album Om Namah Shivay, which was distributed exclusively online and included an unadulterated musical version of the Hare Krishna mantra. Hagen believes that the Hindu incarnation of Lord Vishnu known as Krishna was "the King of Jerusalem", and sometimes refers to Krishna as "Christ". She also provided vocals to "Witness" and "Bereit" on KMFDM's Adios.

Also in 1998, she recorded the official club anthem Eisern Union for 1. FC Union Berlin and four versions were issued on a CD single by G.I.B Music and Distribution GmbH.

In 1999, she played the role of Celia Peachum in The Threepenny Opera by Kurt Weill and Bertolt Brecht, alongside Max Raabe. She also regularly performs songs by Kurt Weill, Hanns Eisler and Paul Dessau set to Brecht's texts.

2000–2009: Return of the Mother

In 2000, her song "Schön ist die Welt" became the official song of Expo 2000. Another cover of a Zarah Leander song "Der Wind hat mir ein Lied erzählt" was a minor hit the same year. The album Return of the Mother was released in February 2001, accompanied by another German tour. Hagen, a supporter of HIV/AIDS denialism, wrote the song "Handgrenade" on the album Return of the Mother for Christine Maggiore. In 2001 she collaborated with Rosenstolz and Marc Almond on the single "Total eclipse"/"Die schwarze Witwe" that reached No. 22 in Germany. On 14 October 2002 Nina hit Moscow by coming there with her concert, while interviews with the eccentric singer were aired on many TV-channels.

Hagen dubbed the voice of Sally in the German release of Tim Burton's The Nightmare before Christmas, Yubaba/Zeniba in Spirited Away and she has also done voice work on the movie Hot Dogs by Michael Schoemann. Due to the death of Elisabeth Volkmann (†2006), the German voice of Marge, during the dubbing of the hit TV show "The Simpsons" 17th season, Nina was a strong contender for the role, which eventually went to Anke Engelke. Hagen has been featured on songs by other bands, for instance on Oomph!'s song "Fieber". She did a cover of Rammstein's "Seemann" with Apocalyptica. Later albums include Big Band Explosion (2003), in which she sang numerous swing covers with her then husband, Danish singer and performer, Lucas Alexander. This was followed by Heiß, a greatest hits album. The following album, Journey to the Snow Queen, is more of an audio book – she reads the Snow Queen fairy tale with Tchaikovsky's The Nutcracker in the background. In 2005 Nina Hagen headlined the Drop Dead Festival in New York City. Hagen was an active protester against the war in Iraq. In 2006 she was a part of the Popstars team. She is a vegetarian. In August 2009 she was baptized in the Protestant Reformed church of Schüttorf. On 21 October after seven years passed she visited Moscow again.

Since 2010: Personal Jesus and Volksbeat

After a four-year lapse her next album, Personal Jesus, was released 16 July 2010, followed by Volksbeat, released 11 November 2011.

When Angela Merkel ended her 16-year chancellorship of Germany in December 2021, she chose Hagen's song Du hast den Farbfilm vergessen (You Forgot the Colour Film) as one of the three pieces to be played at her Großer Zapfenstreich military leaving ceremony.

Discography

 Nina Hagen Band (1978)
 Unbehagen (1979)
 NunSexMonkRock (1982)
 Fearless / Angstlos (1983)
 Nina Hagen in Ekstasy / In Ekstase (1985)
 Nina Hagen (1989)
 Street (1991)
 Revolution Ballroom (1993)
 FreuD euch / BeeHappy (1995)
 Om Namah Shivay (1999)
 Return of the Mother (2000)
 Big Band Explosion (2003)
 Irgendwo auf der Welt (2006)
 Personal Jesus (2010)
 Volksbeat (2011)
 Unity (2022)

Filmography

 Heiraten/Weiblich – 1975
 Heute ist Freitag – 1975
 Liebesfallen – 1976
 Unser stiller Mann – 1976
 Ticket of No Return (Bildnis einer Trinkerin) – 1979
 Cha-Cha – 1979
 Pankow '95 – 1983
 The Nightmare Before Christmas – 1993
 Lilien in der Bank – 1996
 Vasilisa – 2000
 7 Dwarves – Men Alone in the Wood – 2004
 7 Zwerge – Der Wald ist nicht genug – 2006
 Buying the Band – 2013
 Gutterdämmerung – 2016

See also

 Neue Deutsche Welle
 Neue Deutsche Härte

References

External links

 
 
 

1955 births
Living people
 
People from East Berlin
Singers from Berlin
Converts to Christianity
German Protestants
Women rock singers
Women new wave singers
Women punk rock singers
German people of Jewish descent
German autobiographers
Feminist musicians
German-language singers
English-language singers from Germany
German punk rock musicians
CBS Records artists
Mercury Records artists
Women autobiographers
Converts to Hinduism
Converts to Protestantism from Hinduism
German emigrants to the United States
20th-century German actresses
German film actresses
21st-century German women singers
HIV/AIDS denialists
Television controversies in Germany
Obscenity controversies in music
Obscenity controversies in television
Female masturbation
German contraltos
Jews in punk rock